Mosses are non-vascular flowerless plants that form the division Bryophyta.

Mosses may also refer to:

Places
Mosses, Alabama, a town in the United States
Col des Mosses, a mountain pass in Switzerland

People
Peter Mosses, a British computer scientist
William Mosses, a British trade unionist

See also

Moss (disambiguation)
Moses (disambiguation)